Liberty Hill is an unincorporated community in Jackson County, Alabama, United States.

References

Unincorporated communities in Jackson County, Alabama
Unincorporated communities in Alabama